The Walt Disney World Marathon is an annual marathon held every January in Orlando, Florida by runDisney (a division of Disney Sports Enterprises).  The race has been held since 1994.  The marathon is part of a weekend race series that also includes a 5K, a 10K, and a half marathon, as well as a number of challenges involving one or more of these races.

History
The first marathon, run in January 1994, featured 5,588 runners. This marathon was the first race that launched the Disney Endurance Series, which is now runDisney.

In 1995, the men's current race record was set by Leonid Shvetsov, of Russia, at 2:11:50. While in 1996, electronic timing was first used to produce race results.

With the 1998 fifth anniversary of the WDW Marathon having a theme of "Herculean Entertainment", the inaugural Donald Half Marathon is held on the same day until 2005. A corporate relay option was also added to the marathon.

In 2003, the first local resident, Bea Marie Alitieri of Clermont, won the 10th anniversary of the WDW Marathon women's division at a pace of 2:53:10. Brazilian Adriano Bastos began his eight-year streak of consecutive marathon wins in 2003. The 10th anniversary also saw the debut of the "perfect" program, which included 152 runners who had completed all ten Marathons between 1994 and 2003.

In 2006, the first Goofy Race and Half Challenge is first given with the full and half marathons were first ran on separate days, Saturday and Sunday.

The 2010 races set two records with the largest participant field (55,000) and the coldest starting temperatures (low 30s). Also in 2010, the first Pre-race Pasta Party and a Post Race Celebration were held at Epcot.

In 2011 the racers were allowed to vote for the medal design and it was the year of "Marathon Monday". Bastos' winning streak was broken by fellow Brazilian Fredison Costa. The 2012 year was the 15th anniversary of the Donald Half Marathon which saw the only running of the Walt Disney World Chip and Dale Marathon Relay.

The 20th Anniversary of the Walt Disney World Marathon was held in 2013, as 95 marathon runners who ran all 20 marathons were recognized. 2013 was the first year where men were outnumbered by the women (57%).

The 2014 World Marathon Weekend added the Walt Disney World 10K plus the Dopey Challenge for completing all four weekend races. RunDisney reduced the number of registration allowed for the races and add more race corrals and gender-specific sizing for participant shirts.

A new medal was introduced for the Goofy Challenge for its 10th anniversary in 2015. The Castaway Cay Challenge race was inaugurated in 2015, with those that ran a Walt Disney World Marathon Weekend 5K plus distance race and booked the next cruise on Disney Dream. 700 racers participated in this 5K race on the Disney Cruise Line's private island, Castaway Cay.

In 2017, the Goofy Challenge, Dopey Challenge, and half marathon were not held because of  anticipated lightning and a lack of necessary shelter on course should it be required during the race. All registered half marathon runners received their half marathon medals.

The Marathon celebrated its 25th anniversary in January 2018, at which time the field of 26,000 participants included the remaining 76 "perfect" runners who had completed all 25 Marathons between 1994 and 2018. 75-year-old Gretna, Louisiana native Rudy Smith was the oldest of those "perfect" participants, completing his 57th career marathon in a time of 5:01:03. That year, Lock Haven University alum Nicholas Hilton broke the 13-year streak of Brazilian victors (compiled by Adriano Bastos and Fredison Costa) to become just the second American male to win the Marathon.

Hilton won again in 2020, becoming the first American male to win the race twice. Temperatures during the event reached a record high of 84 degrees, prompting event coordinators to shorten the course by two miles and send out a text message to participants: "Given today's rising temperatures and the length of the race, for our runners' safety, we are modifying the remainder of the event." The message was further clarified on Twitter: "Even with the modified course – run times will still be recorded and runners will receive medals at the finish line."

The 2021 in-person edition of the race was cancelled due to the coronavirus pandemic, with all registrants given the option of running the race virtually or obtaining a full refund.

In 2022, Brittany Charboneau became the first woman to win all four races and the Dopey Challenge

Course 

Disney's Blizzard Beach Water Park was added to the marathon route in 1995.  The course was again redesigned in 1999 to included the newly opened Disney’s Animal Kingdom theme park. The course was changed again in 2013, adding a lap around the Walt Disney World Speedway plus some distance in the ESPN Wide World of Sports. In 2020, the course was amended to remove the Wide World of Sports segment that many runners had come to call "The Rat Maze" and replace it with a segment passing through the eastern portion of Blizzard Beach.

Challenges
Goofy's Race and a Half Challenge, introduced in 2006, involves completing both the Half Marathon on Saturday and the full Marathon on Sunday for a combined 39.3 miles over two days.

The Dopey Challenge, introduced in 2014 along with the Disney World 10K, involves completing all four races – the Walt Disney World 5K on Thursday, the Walt Disney World 10K on Friday, the Walt Disney World Half Marathon on Saturday, and the Walt Disney World Marathon on Sunday – for a combined 48.6 miles over four days. In additional to the four individual race medals, runners who complete the Dopey Challenge are awarded both the Goofy's Race and a Half Challenge and Dopey Challenge medals.

The Castaway Cay Challenge, introduced in 2015, involves completing any Marathon Weekend race before boarding the Disney Dream at Port Canaveral the following Monday and sailing to Castaway Cay –Disney Cruise Line's private island in the Bahamas– to complete a 5K race across the island.

Winners 

Brazilian Adriano Bastos holds the record of most WDW Marathon wins at eight, while Brazilian Giovanna Martins holds the women's record at four.

Key: Course record

Marathon

Half marathon

See also
List of marathon races in North America

Notes

References

External links

Marathons in the United States
Recurring sporting events established in 1994
Marathon
1994 establishments in Florida
Walt Disney World